The 1993–94 Women's EHF Cup was the 13th edition of the competition. Viborg HK defeated Debreceni VSC on away goals to become the first Danish club to win it. CB Amadeo Tortajada and CSL Dijon also reached the semifinals, while defending champion Rapid București was defeated in the Round of 16.

Round of 32

Round of 16

Quarter-finals

Semifinals

Final

References

Women's EHF Cup
EHF
1994 in handball